Anthony A. Grace is an American neuroscientist, currently a Distinguished Professor of Neuroscience and Professor of Psychiatry and Psychology at University of Pittsburgh, including working in neurophysiology of basal ganglia system related to psychiatric disorders.

References

Year of birth missing (living people)
Living people
University of Pittsburgh faculty
American neuroscientists